Bluebeard (lit. "Thawing") is a 2017 South Korean psychological thriller film directed by Lee Soo-yeon. It stars Cho Jin-woong.

Plot
Seung-Hoon (Cho Jin-Woong) is a physician who opened a clinic in Seoul but went bankrupt. He landed a job at a hospital and he soon gets involved in a series of murder cases when his patient murmurs something disturbing.

Cast
Cho Jin-woong as Byun Seung-hoon
Shin Goo as Jung Sung-geun's father  
Kim Dae-myung as Jung Sung-geun
Song Young-chang as Jo Kyung-hwan / Nam In-soo
Lee Chung-ah as Mi-yeon 
Yoon Se-ah as Jo Soo-jung
Kim Joo-ryoung as Mi-sook
Yoon Da-kyung as Ji-sook
Kim Kyung-min as Hospital Director 
Lee Kang-jae as Jung Kyung-soo
Moon Jung-hyun as Byun Young-hoon
Jung Do-won as Tattoo man
Jung Ah-mi as Bae Jung-ja
Marie-Joelle Afarti as Jung Kyung-soo's mother 
Han Chul-woo ad Jurisdiction Detective
Jo Suk-hyun - Captain of Gangnam Detective Squad
Park Hee-jung as Opening DJ
Koo Eun-jung as Weather Caster

Production
Bluebeard is director Lee Soo-yeon's first feature film in fourteen years after her 2003 film The Uninvited. Cho Jin-woong, who played a doctor suffering a mental breakdown, lost nearly 40 pounds (18 kilograms) for his role in the film.

Filming began on July 20, 2015, and ended on October 7, 2015. The film was shot entirely in South Korea, and partially in the Philippines for the ending scene where the teenager met his Filipina mother.

Release
Bluebeard was released in theaters on March 1, 2017. It drew 386,088 viewers on its first day of release, setting the record for the best March opening ever in South Korea. The film was sold to Japan, Hong Kong, Macau, the Philippines, and received a limited North American release in the U.S. and Canada. The film was also selected to screen at the Brussels International Fantastic Film Festival,  the Hawaii International Film Festival and the Udine Far East Film Festival in Italy.

Awards and nominations

References

External links

 Bluebeard at Well Go USA Entertainment
 
 
 Bluebeard at Naver Movies 

South Korean psychological thriller films
2017 films
Lotte Entertainment films
2017 psychological thriller films
South Korean serial killer films
2010s serial killer films
2010s South Korean films